Wise Up may refer to:

 "Wise Up", a song by Amy Grant from her 1985 album Unguarded
 "Wise Up", a  song by Aimee Mann, originally from the  Jerry Maguire soundtrack but better known from the Magnolia soundtrack
 Wise Up (TV programme), a 1995–2000 British factual children's television programme broadcast on Channel 4
 Wise Up!,  a 2006 album by The Hard Lessons
 WiseUp & Co., an American record label founded by hip hop artist Sylvan LaCue in 2015